Termessa catocalina is a moth in the subfamily Arctiinae. It was described by Francis Walker in 1865. It is found in Australia, where it has been recorded from New South Wales and Victoria.

The wingspan is about 15 mm. The forewings are grey patterned with a small white spot near the apex. The hindwings are yellow with a dark brown mark at the apex and a larger brown mark at the tornus.

The larvae feed on lichens.

References

Moths described in 1865
Lithosiini